Dudley Parker (born 5 May 1962) is a Bahamian sprinter. He competed in the men's 100 metres at the 1984 Summer Olympics.

References

1962 births
Living people
Athletes (track and field) at the 1984 Summer Olympics
Bahamian male sprinters
Olympic athletes of the Bahamas
Place of birth missing (living people)